Erik Glimnér  (8 July 1914 – 15 January 1999) was a Swedish politician. He was a member of the Centre Party.

References
This article was initially translated from the Swedish Wikipedia article.

Centre Party (Sweden) politicians
1914 births
1999 deaths